Ildephonse Hategekimana (born 1 February 1964) is a Rwandan soldier who participated in the Rwandan genocide.

An ethnic Hutu, Hategekimana was born on 1 February 1964 in Mugina commune in Gitarama prefecture. In 1994, he held the rank of lieutenant in the Rwandan Armed Forces, and was the commander of the Ngoma camp in Butare prefecture.

On 27 November 2000, the International Criminal Tribunal for Rwanda (ICTR) issued an indictment against Hategekimana, charging him with "genocide, or in the alternative complicity in genocide, direct and public incitement to commit genocide, and crimes against humanity."

Hategekimana was the chief of security in a Rwandan refugee camp in Loukoléla in Congo-Brazzaville for some years prior to his arrest. He lived with his wife there and was a respected leader living under the alias "Isidore Balihafi".

Hategekimana was arrested in the Republic of Congo on 16 February 2003, and then transferred to the ICTR. He was convicted of three counts of genocide and one count of crimes against humanity and sentenced to life imprisonment by the ICTR on 6 December 2010. The conviction was upheld by the Appeals Chamber on 8 May 2012.

References

External links 
U.S. State Department press release on Hategekimana's arrest, 20 February 2003
UN Tribunal Confirms Arrest of Former Rwandan Military Officer in Congo Brazzaville, Hirondelle, 14 April 2012

Rwandan soldiers
People from Kamonyi District
Living people
1964 births

People convicted by the International Criminal Tribunal for Rwanda